Research in Astronomy and Astrophysics is a monthly peer-reviewed scientific journal covering all branches of astronomy and astrophysics. It was established in 1981 as Acta Astrophysica Sinica and published in Chinese. It was renamed Chinese Journal of Astronomy and Astrophysics in 2001, switching to publication in English and restarting volume numbering. It obtained its current name in 2009. The journal is published by IOP Publishing, on behalf of  the National Astronomical Observatory of China and the Chinese Astronomical Society. The editor-in-chief is Jingxiu Wang (National Astronomical Observatory of China).

According to the Journal Citation Reports, the journal has a 2020 impact factor of 1.469.

References

External links
 

Astronomy journals
Monthly journals
English-language journals
Astrophysics journals
Publications established in 1981
IOP Publishing academic journals